Rawat Fort is an early 16th century fort in the Pothohar plateau of Pakistan, near the city of Rawalpindi in the province of Punjab. The fort was built to defend the Pothohar plateau from the forces of the Pashtun king Sher Shah Suri.

Location
It is 17 km east of Rawalpindi on Grand Trunk Road. The 2nd century Mankiala stupa can be seen from the roof of the fort's mosque. The fort is located approximately 50 miles from the vast Rohtas Fort, which had been built by Sher Shah Suri to establish control of the Potohar region.

Etymology
Rawat Fort derives is named from the Arabic word Rabat, meaning caravanserai - an inn for caravans.

History
The fort was founded as a caravanserai in the 15th century by the Delhi Sultanate, though the caravan itself may have been built atop a Ghaznavid-era fort that was established in 1036 CE.

The caravanserai was then later fortified in the 16th century by the Mughal emperor Humayun in order to defend the Pothohar plateau from Sher Shah Suri's forces.

The fort was the scene of a battle between the Mughal Emperor Humayun and Afghan king Sher Shah Suri in 1546.

Layout
The fort is almost in square form and has two gates. There is also a quadrangular building with a dome in the fort's inner area – an area which also contains many graves. Along the perimeter are several small cells, which may have originally been small rooms rented out to itinerant merchants.The fort also contains a mosque with three domes.

Conservation
The fort is federally protected as a Cultural Heritage Site of Punjab, and is managed by the Ministry of Information, Broadcasting and National Heritage. In November 2016, a conservation plan was commissioned for preservation of the fort. 50 million rupees were allocated in March 2017 towards the first of two phases of conservation of the Rawat Fort.

Gallery

See also

List of forts in Pakistan
Sar Jalal
Rohtas Fort
Pharwala
Mankiala stupa

References

Forts in Punjab, Pakistan
History of Pakistan